Men's handball at the 2014 Asian Games was held in Incheon, South Korea from September 20 to October 2, 2014.

Squads

Results
All times are Korea Standard Time (UTC+09:00)

Preliminary round

Group A

Group B

Group C

Group D

Classification 13th–14th

Classification round 9–12

Main round

Group 1

Group 2

Classification 5th–8th

Classification 7th–8th

Classification 5th–6th

Final round

Semifinals

Bronze medal match

Gold medal match

Final standing

References

Results

External links 
 

Handball at the 2014 Asian Games